Mobitel, an acronym of "mobile telephone", is the name of several mobile telecommunication companies:

Mobitel (Denmark)
Mobitel (Georgia)
Mobitel (Iraq-Kurdistan)
Mobitel (Slovenia)
SLTMobitel, formerly Mobitel, a Sri Lankan telecommunications company
Zain Sudan, formerly Mobitel, a Sudanese mobile company